The 2012 Arab Cup Final was a football match that took place on 6 July 2012, at the Prince Abdullah al-Faisal Stadium in Jeddah, Saudi Arabia, to determine the winner of the 2012 Arab Cup.
Morocco with the local A' team defeated Libya 3–1 on penalties after 1–1 on extra time to win their first Arab Cup.

Road to the final

Match

Details

References

External links
2012 Arab Cup - rsssf.com

F
2012
Nations
Nations
International association football competitions hosted by Saudi Arabia
Libya national football team matches
Morocco national football team matches
Arab Cup Final 2012